The following is a list of alleged and confirmed assassinations of scientists reported to have been specifically targeted by the State of Israel:

External links 

 Politico: When Israel Hatched a Secret Plan to Assassinate Iranian Scientists

References 

Mossad
Mossad
Scientists